Artur Andriyovych Ryabov (born 20 August 2000) is a Ukrainian professional footballer who plays as a central midfielder for Ukrainian club Volyn Lutsk.

References

External links
 Profile on Volyn Lutsk official website
 

2000 births
Living people
People from Komarno, Ukraine
Ukrainian footballers
Association football midfielders
FC Volyn Lutsk players
Ukrainian First League players
Ukrainian Second League players
Sportspeople from Lviv Oblast